Helicops danieli, Daniel's keelback,  is a species of snake in the family Colubridae. It is found in Colombia.

References 

Helicops
Snakes of South America
Reptiles of Colombia
Endemic fauna of Colombia
Reptiles described in 1938